Dale Hamer (born 1937) is a former American football official in the National Football League (NFL) who served from 1978 to 2001, with a break taken for health reasons during the 1995 season.  During his 23 seasons in the NFL, Hamer was assigned to officiate in two Super Bowls, as a head linesman in Super Bowl XVII and in Super Bowl XXII. Additionally, he was an alternate referee for Super Bowl XXVII.  

Hamer's career in the NFL started in 1978 as a head linesman.  He was later promoted to referee in 1989 upon the retirement of long-time referee Fred Silva.  In 1995, Hamer was forced to take a leave from officiating when doctors discovered that he had a heart murmur. Further tests revealed that Hamer had stenosis and calcification of his aortic heart valve, and it would need to be replaced.  In July 1995, Dale received a pericardial tissue heart valve.  As a result, he missed the entire 1995 NFL season, but returned at the start of the 1996 NFL season after Gordon McCarter announced his retirement. He returned to the head linesman position in 1998 and worked on the crews of Larry Nemmers and Bernie Kukar.  After retiring as an on-field official following the 2001 NFL season, Hamer assumed new duties as an instant replay official for the NFL, a position he continues to serve in today. 

Hamer, who wore uniform number 104, is a past president of the National Football League Referees Association.

Hamer is a 1960 graduate of California State College in Western Pennsylvania (now California University of Pennsylvania), and in the early 1960s taught algebra at Clairton High School in Clairton, Pennsylvania.

References

1937 births
Living people
California University of Pennsylvania alumni
University of Pittsburgh alumni
People from Fayette County, Pennsylvania
20th-century American educators
National Football League officials